Training for Utopia, also stylized as TFU, was an American metalcore band active from 1996 to October 2000.

History 
The band first signed with Tooth & Nail Records and was later moved to Solid State Records, the Tooth & Nail imprint that promotes heavy Christian music. Training for Utopia subsequently became popular in the Christian metal scene during its active years, although the band actively tried to remove themselves from that label during their later years.

Their brief existence included a tour with Zao and at the time the upcoming band Spitfire, as well as Warlord. It was during this time that the band hired Carlos Colón (later to join The Deadlines) for their 1998 tour providing synthesizers and live guitar to their live show. Immediately following the tour Carlos left the band to pursue other aspirations. After a temporary hiatus the band returned with their second full length Throwing a Wrench into the American Music Machine, which has been noted as a shift away from the band's early metalcore sound, utilizing heavier use of electronics and sampling. After a small tour of the material the band disbanded.

At the demise of Training for Utopia, members Ryan (formerly of Focal Point) and Don Clark announced that they were starting a new project called The American Spectator in October 2000. Don and Ryan Clark started "Asterik Studio" in Seattle, a graphic design shop where they completed many projects, including album artwork for former label-mates. In 2000, they founded the Christian metal band Demon Hunter.

Members 
Final line-up
 Ryan Clark – vocals, guitar (1996–2000) (currently with Demon Hunter)
 Don Clark – guitar (1996–2000) (played with Demon Hunter)
 Steve Saxby – bass guitar, vocals (1996–2000) (currently with Out of Place)
 Morley Boyer – drums (1996–2000) (played on An Angle)
Former
 Rob Dennler – vocals (1996) (played with The Roots of Orchis)
Touring
 Carlos Colon – synthesizers (1998) (later joined The Deadlines)

Don Clark has stated that Training for Utopia originally began with musician Rob Dennler as its lead vocalist, though Dennler was replaced by Ryan Clark before the band recorded its first demo.

Discography

References

External links 

 Interview with Don Clark, circa 2000
 Post-TFU interview with Don Clark, circa 2001
 SHZine interview with Ryan Clark (February 2000)

Metalcore musical groups from California
Heavy metal musical groups from California
Musical groups established in 1996
Musical groups disestablished in 2000
Tooth & Nail Records artists
Solid State Records artists